Ulla Flegel (born 22 October 1939) is an Austrian athlete. She competed in the women's high jump at the 1964 Summer Olympics.

References

1939 births
Living people
Athletes (track and field) at the 1964 Summer Olympics
Austrian female high jumpers
Austrian pentathletes
Olympic athletes of Austria
Sportspeople from Linz